The Charles W. Davidson College of Engineering is one of the seven colleges under San Jose State University (SJSU) in downtown San Jose, California, United States. This college is located on the northeastern side of the main campus, which is in the heart of the Silicon Valley. The vast majority of their resources are located in a four-story building known as the "Engineering Building." The college is named after Charles W. Davidson, who donated $15 million to the formerly known SJSU College of Engineering. Charles W. Davidson is a civil engineer for the City of San Jose and a real estate broker for companies he founded, such as DKD Property Management and L&D Construction.

Rankings 

 According to Business Insider in 2012, the Charles W. Davidson College of Engineering is among the top 50 best Engineering schools in the world.
 During 2013, the Silicon Valley Business Journal under the American City Business Journals ranks the Charles W. Davidson College of Engineering No. 1 in Silicon Valley's First Choice for new Engineering hires.
 U.S. News & World Report has ranked the college in the top 10 public engineering programs for the 12th consecutive year in 2022.
 According to Niche, the Charles W. Davidson College of Engineering is No. 311 in the nation and No. 27 in California.
 SJSU's computer engineering program is ranked 1st in the nation among public university engineering programs offering bachelor's and master's degrees and 2nd nationally among all public and private colleges that do not offer doctoral degrees, according to U.S. News & World Report's 2015 college rankings.

Academics 

The Charles W. Davidson College of Engineering provides fourteen undergraduate majors, seventeen Master's degrees, ten academic minors, and six academic certificates from thirteen engineering disciplines.

San Jose State offers a double degree program in computer engineering where one earns a bachelor's (B.S.) and master's (M.S.) degree in five years. Students in this program are allowed to take graduate classes, complete only one project for graduation, and have guaranteed admission to the graduate program per completion of requirements.

Admissions 

The Charles W. Davidson College of Engineering generally has the same requirements as the whole university. San Jose State is objective for most applicants, where it primarily decides applicants based on GPA, SAT/ACT, and the rigor of classes taken during one's secondary school. State residency and graduating from a high school in the Santa Clara County are factors as well. Applicants who pose unique, personal circumstances may be given a different outlook on their application if and only if they apply to the Educational Opportunity Program at San Jose State. This college will weigh the SAT/ACT Math score more than the other sections during the admissions process.

Facilities 
 Engineering Computing Center
 Central Machine Shop
 Industrial Studies Building
 Engineering Building

References 

San Jose State University
Engineering universities and colleges in California